Robin D'Abreo (born March 3, 1975 in Bombay, India) is an Indian-born Canadian field hockey player who earned his first international cap in 1993 against France.

The midfielder D'Abrero grew up with the sport in India, where both his father (Ralph D'Abreo) and older brother played the game. It was only in Canada though that D'Abreo himself started playing competitively. He began with the Toronto Field Junior Jets at age thirteen. D'Abreo is married to former Canadian Women's National Team player Dana Anderson.

International senior competitions
 1993 - Intercontinental Cup, Poznan (7th)
 1995 - Pan American Games, Mar del Plata (2nd)
 1996 - Olympic Qualifier, Barcelona (6th)
 1996 - World Cup Preliminary, Sardinia (2nd)
 1997 - World Cup Qualifier, Kuala Lumpur (5th)
 1998 - World Cup, Utrecht (8th)
 1998 - Commonwealth Games, Kuala Lumpur (not ranked)
 1999 - Pan American Games, Winnipeg (1st)
 2000 - Americas Cup, Cuba (2nd)
 2000 - Olympic Games, Sydney (10th)
 2001 - World Cup Qualifier, Edinburgh (8th)
 2002 - Indoor Pan American Cup, Rockville (1st and Tournament MVP)
 2002 - Commonwealth Games, Manchester (6th)
 2003 - Indoor World Cup, Leipzig (6th)
 2003 - Pan American Games, Santo Domingo (2nd)
 2004 - Olympic Qualifying Tournament, Madrid (11th)
 2004 - Pan Am Cup, London (2nd)
 2006 - Commonwealth Games, Melbourne (9th)

References
 Profile

External links

1975 births
Living people
Canadian people of Goan descent
Canadian sportspeople of Indian descent
Male field hockey midfielders
Canadian male field hockey players
Field hockey people from Ontario
Field hockey players at the 1998 Commonwealth Games
Field hockey players at the 2000 Summer Olympics
Field hockey players at the 2002 Commonwealth Games
Field hockey players at the 2006 Commonwealth Games
Indian emigrants to Canada
Naturalized citizens of Canada
Olympic field hockey players of Canada
Field hockey players from Mumbai
Pan American Games gold medalists for Canada
Pan American Games silver medalists for Canada
Pan American Games medalists in field hockey
1998 Men's Hockey World Cup players
Field hockey players at the 1999 Pan American Games
Field hockey players at the 1995 Pan American Games
Field hockey players at the 2003 Pan American Games
Medalists at the 1995 Pan American Games
Commonwealth Games competitors for Canada